Sub-national statistical services when autonomous are part of the overall statistical architecture of a country along with a central statistical organisation existing in nearly every country (see List of national and international statistical services), and also various sectoral statistical services established in Ministerial departments or other government agencies. This is particularly true in the case of most Federation of states as shown in the table below. Those of these sub-national statistical services established in non-independent territories (from UK, Netherlands, France, etc.) generally act as a central statistical organisation for the territory. The mandate of these autonomous services varies from country to country; their statistical production intends to respond mainly to local needs for statistics, complementary to the production of national statistical data.

See also
List of national and international statistical services
List of statistical offices in Germany

References

Official statistics